Elizabeth Boyd (c. 1710 – 1745) was an English writer and poet who supported her family by writing novels, poetry, a play, and a periodical.<ref>The Snail: or The lady's lucubrations. Being entertaining letters between a lady at St. James's, and her friend at Dover, on new and curious subjects. By Eloisa. (To be continued monthly.) [London]: E. Boyd, 1745.</ref> She also wrote under the noms de plume Louisa or Eloisa. Boyd is one of three known members of the Shakespeare Ladies Club.

Life and work
Little is known of her birth or career. From her writings it can be gleaned that she came from a large family who had supported the Stuart cause. Her father enjoyed Stuart favour, her mother is said to have been worn down by the care of many children. It was to support her ailing mother that she took up writing. The subscription lists to her work contain many aristocrats which suggests the family had been well connected but had fallen on hard times.

She first published poetry under the name of Louisa, Variety:A Poem (1727) and Verses on the King's Birthday (1730). Her first major work was a novel entitled The Happy Unfortunate; Or The female page. This appeared in 1732 and was reprinted in 1737. It is a masquerade romance in which the lead female characters hide behind masks for most of the story. With money from this she set up a stationers shop in George Court, Princes Street, London, near Leicester Fields

The Humorous Miscellany of 1733 contains her best known poem On the Death of an Infant of five Days old; being a beautiful but abortive Birth. She wrote a play Don Sancho, Or The Students Whim, (1739), which was never performed. However, Don Sancho was given a reading in the green room of Theatre Royal, Drury Lane. Don Sancho takes place in an Oxford College garden and features the ghosts of William Shakespeare and John Dryden. At the end of the play, after the ghosts return to the afterlife, Minerva creates a monument to Shakespeare; this ending is why many Shakespearean scholars believe Boyd was involved in the Shakespeare Ladies Club and, specifically, the Club's fundraising efforts for the Shakespeare memorial statue in Poet's Corner in Westminster Abbey.The Snail: Or the Lady's Lucubrations (1745) was an ambitious project to produce a regular periodical aimed at aristocratic Ladies. Only one volume was produced and there is an indication in her writing that her health was failing. It contains veiled attacks on the Duke and Duchess of Marlborough, who twenty years previously had engaged in Jacobite intrigue but had abandoned their support in favour of what many saw as their own career advancement.

Bibliography

 Novels 
 The Happy-Unfortunate; Or, the Female-Page: a Novel, Etc Periodicals 
 The Snail: Or The Lady's Lucubrations. Being entertaining letters between a lady at St. James's, and her friend at Dover, on new and curious subjects Plays 
 Don Sancho, Or The Students Whim Poems 
 On the Death of an Infant of five Days old; being a beautiful but abortive Birth Truth, a poem : Address'd to the Right Honourable William Lord Harrington Variety: A Poem, 1727 Verses Congratulatory, on the Happy Marriage of the Right Honourable the Lady Diana Spencer with the Lord John Russel The humorous miscellany; or, riddles for the beaux. Humbly inscribed to the ... Earl of CardiganReferences

External links

 Works by Elizabeth Boyd 

 On the Death of an Infant of five Days old; being a beautiful but abortive Birth by Elizabeth Boyd, 1733. Poem in full at Poetry Nook website Accessed April 2016
 ELOISA, pseud. The Snail: or the Lady's Lucubrations. Being Entertaining Letters between a Lady at St. James's, and Her Friend at Dover, on New and Curious Subjects. by Eloisa. (to Be Continued Monthly.). London: E. Boyd, 1745. Print. Available through WorldCat. 
 Boyd, Elizabeth. Don Sancho Or, the Students Whim, a Ballad Opera of Two Acts, with Minerva's Triumph, a Masque. New York: Garland, 1974. Print. Available through WorldCat.
 BOYD, Elizabeth. The Female Page: a Genuine and Interesting History Relating to Some Persons of Distinction, Etc. London: Olive Payne, 1737. Available through WorldCat. 
 Boyd, Elizabeth. Admiral Haddock: Or, the Progress of Spain. a Poem. Farmington Hills, Mich: Thomson Gale, 2005. Internet resource. Available through WorldCat.  
 Boyd, Elizabeth. Variety: a Poem, 1727. Boston, MA: Northeastern University Women Writers Project, 2001. Internet resource. Available through WorldCat.  
 Boyd, Elizabeth. Verses Congratulatory, on the Happy Marriage of the Right Honourable the Lady Diana Spencer with the Lord John Russel. by Elizabeth Boyd. Farmington Hills, Mich: Thomson Gale, 2005. Available through WorldCat.  
 Boyd, Elizabeth. The Humorous Miscellany; Or, Riddles for the Beaux. Humbly Inscribed to the ... Earl of Cardigan. by E B''. Farmington Hills, Mich: Thomson Gale, 2005. Available through WorldCat.

1710 births
1745 deaths
18th-century English poets
18th-century English novelists
18th-century English dramatists and playwrights
18th-century English women writers
18th-century English writers
English women poets
English women novelists
English women dramatists and playwrights